Mark Raymond Speakman  (born 6 November 1959) is an Australian politician. He has served as the New South Wales Attorney General since January 2017 in the second Berejiklian ministry since April 2019, and in the first arrangement of the Perrottet ministry. Speakman is a member of the New South Wales Legislative Assembly representing Cronulla for the Liberal Party since 2011.
 
He has previously served as the Minister for Prevention of Domestic and Sexual Violence in the Berejiklian and Perrottet ministries; and the  Minister for the Environment, the Minister for Heritage, and the Assistant Minister for Planning between April 2015 and January 2017 in the second Baird government.

Early years and background
Speakman attended government schools in Caringbah (including Caringbah High School) before studying law and economics at the University of Sydney and then the University of Cambridge, where he graduated with a master's degree. A practising lawyer, he was called to the bar in 1991, and was made senior counsel in 2004.

Political career
Preselected in November 2010, following announcement that the sitting member Malcolm Kerr would retire, Speakman overcame a challenge from Stephen Mutch, a former member for the federal seat of Cook and former state member of the Legislative Council. For Speakman he finally beaten Mutch in a preselection contest as Speakman had challenged Mutch for the Cook preselection prior to the 1998 federal election. Speakman however withdrew from that contest when former state deputy Liberal leader Bruce Baird became the compromise candidate.

At the 2011 state election, Speakman was elected with a swing of 9.4 points and won the seat with 75.5 per cent of the vote on a two-party-preferred basis. Speakman's main opponent was Stefanie Jones, representing Labor. Premier O'Farrell considered immediately elevating Speakman to the ministry following the 2011 election; however he was not appointed to the ministry until April 2015 when, following the 2015 state election, he was appointed as the Minister for the Environment, the Minister for Heritage, and the Assistant Minister for Planning in the second Baird ministry.

Following the resignation of Mike Baird as Premier, Gladys Berejiklian was elected as Liberal leader and sworn in as Premier. The First Berejiklian ministry was subsequently formed with Speakman sworn in as the Attorney General of NSW with effect from 30 January 2017. Following the 2019 state election Speakman was appointed as the Minister for the Prevention of Domestic Violence in addition to his responsibilities as NSW Attorney General in the second Berejiklian ministry with effect from 2 April 2019; a title subsequently amended as the Minister for Prevention of Domestic and Sexual Violence in May 2021. In the second arrangement of the Perrottet ministry, he retained the portfolio title of Attorney General.

In September 2018, Speakman reportedly broke Victor Dominello's arm in an office arm wrestling match.

See also

Second Baird ministry
First Berejiklian ministry
Second Berejiklian ministry
Perrottet ministry

References

External links
Mark Speakman SC – Tenth Floor Chambers
 

|-

Liberal Party of Australia members of the Parliament of New South Wales
Australian Senior Counsel
1959 births
Living people
Members of the New South Wales Legislative Assembly
University of Sydney alumni
Alumni of the University of Cambridge
21st-century Australian politicians
Attorneys General of New South Wales